Choi Chang-Yong  (born 17 September 1985) is a South Korean football player who is currently a Free Agent.

Choi previously played for Suwon Samsung Bluewings in the K-League and National League side Yesan FC.

References

External links 

1985 births
Living people
South Korean footballers
Suwon Samsung Bluewings players
Korean Police FC (Semi-professional) players
K League 1 players
Korea National League players
Association football midfielders